Airlines UK is the trade association for registered airlines in the United Kingdom.

History
In November 2016, the British Air Transport Association became Airlines UK.

References

External links
 Airlines UK

 
Airline trade associations
Aviation organisations based in the United Kingdom
Organisations based in the City of Westminster
Transport in the City of Westminster